Ver Tanzt? is the debut album of Black Ox Orkestar, a Montreal-based band. The lyrics on the album are spoken in Yiddish and talk about the Jewish diaspora.

Track listing
 "Shvartze Flamen, Vayser Fayer"–2:34
 "Papir Iz Dokh Vays"–4:13
 "Fishelakh in Vaser"–3:29
 "Cretan Song"–2:28
 "Ver Tanzt?"–3:17
 "Stav Ya Pitv"–3:51
 "Nign"–2:42
 "Toyte Goyes in Shineln"–3:42
 "Kalarash"–3:04
 "Forn Forstv"–2:26
 "Skocne"–2:21
 "Moscowitz Terkisher"–3:10
 "Di Khasene"–5:42

2004 debut albums
Black Ox Orkestar albums
Constellation Records (Canada) albums